Stadion Pleven is a multi-purpose stadium in Pleven, Bulgaria.  It is currently used mostly for football matches. The stadium holds 25,000 people and it was built in 1952.

References

Football venues in Bulgaria
Multi-purpose stadiums in Bulgaria
Buildings and structures in Pleven
Pleven
PFC Spartak Pleven